The Tawitawi forest rat or Tawitawi Island rat (Rattus tawitawiensis) is a species of rodent in the family Muridae.
It is found only in Tawi-Tawi, Philippines.

References

 Baillie, J. 1996.  Rattus tawitawiensis.   2006 IUCN Red List of Threatened Species.   Downloaded on 20 July 2007.

Rattus
Mammals described in 1985
Rodents of the Philippines
Endemic fauna of the Philippines
Fauna of Tawi-Tawi
Taxonomy articles created by Polbot